Student Transportation Inc., doing business as Student Transportation of America (STA) and Student Transportation of Canada (STC), is a New Jersey-based school bus contractor that focuses on rural and suburban areas. It is the third-largest school bus transportation services provider in North America, with over 11,500 vehicles that transport students in more than 225 school districts.

History 
Student Transportation of America was founded in 1997 by Denis J. Gallagher, who is the chairman and CEO of the company. With roots that can be traced to New Jersey's Coast Cities Bus Service established in 1922 by Gallagher's grandfather, STA successfully completed an initial public offering and its income participating securities (IPS) began trading on the Toronto Stock Exchange in December 2004.

In November 2009, the company changed its name from Student Transportation of America, Ltd., to Student Transportation Inc.  It continues to use the trade names Student Transportation of America and Student Transportation of Canada.

Student Transportation has grown considerably through its "A‑B‑C-D" (Acquisition, Bid, Conversion, and Direct-to-Parent) growth strategy. Among STA's customers is the Los Angeles Unified School District, which is the second largest school district in the United States.

In 2018, Student Transportation was sold to Caisse de dépôt et placement du Québec and Ullico. It was formerly publicly traded on both the Toronto Stock Exchange and Nasdaq.

As of 15 June 2022 Student Transportation of America acquired Pacific Western Transportation Group out of Calgary, Alberta.

References

External links 
RideSTBus.com (official company web site)
NASDAQ Exchange Stock Quote for Student Transportation Inc. (STB)
Toronto Stock Exchange Quote for Student Transportation Inc. (STB)

School bus operators
Bus companies of the United States
Companies based in Monmouth County, New Jersey
Transport companies established in 1997
Student transport
Companies formerly listed on the Toronto Stock Exchange
Companies formerly listed on the Nasdaq
Transportation companies based in New Jersey